Majwanaadipitse is a village in Central District of Botswana, located  north of Palapye. The villager has a primary school. The population was 425 in the 2001 census.

References

Populated places in Central District (Botswana)
Villages in Botswana